The Commemorative Medal of the 1914–1918 War was a Belgian commemorative war medal established by royal decree on 21 July 1919 and awarded to all members of the Belgian Armed Forces who served during the First World War that were eligible for the inter-allied victory medal.

Medal description
The Belgian 1914–1918 Commemorative War Medal was struck from bronze, it was 47 mm high by 31 mm wide, triangular shaped and with rounded sides.  On its obverse, the relief left profile of a helmeted soldier within a 29 mm in diameter circular recess, the helmet adorned with laurels.  Between the circular recess and the bottom left corner of the medal, the relief date "1914", in the lower right corner, the relief date "1918".  In the upper point of the triangle, above the circular recess, the relief images of a lion rampant with an oak branch to its left and a laurel branch to its right.  On the reverse, near the top, the relief image of a crown surrounded by the same branches as the lion on the obverse, below the crown, the relief semi circular inscription in French on two rows over the large relief dates "1914 – 1918", "MEDAILLE COMMEMORATIVE / DE LA CAMPAGNE", the inscription repeated in Dutch below the dates "HERDENKINGSMEDAILLE / VAN DEN VELDTOCHT" (COMMEMORATIVE MEDAL OF THE 1914 – 1918 CAMPAIGN).

Ribbon and devices
The medal was suspended by a ring through the suspension loop to a 39 mm wide red silk moiré ribbon with an 11 mm wide central yellow stripe bordered by 1 mm wide black stripes.

Multiple devices were allowed for wear on the ribbon:
A crown for volunteers, also eligible for a separate medal;
Silver bars, the 1st bar denoting a year at the front, consecutive individual silver bars denoting additional periods of six months at the front;
Gold bar, worn in lieu of five silver bars;
A red enamelled cross for each wound received in combat;
Naval anchor, for sailors also awarded the "Maritime Decoration";
"1916-R-1917" or "1916-R-1918" clasps to members of the Expeditionary Corps to Russia.

Notable recipients (partial list)

The individuals listed below were awarded the 1914–1918 Commemorative War Medal:
HM King Albert
Lieutenant General Alphonse Ferdinand Tromme
Cavalry Lieutenant General Marcel Jooris
Major General Maurice Jacmart
Lieutenant General Jean-Baptiste Piron
Lieutenant General Jules Joseph Pire
Cavalry Lieutenant General Sir Maximilien de Neve de Roden
Cavalry Lieutenant General Baron Victor Van Strijdonck de Burkel
Lieutenant General Georges Deffontaine
Lieutenant General Alphonse Verstraete
Lieutenant General Baron Raoul de Hennin de Boussu-Walcourt
Lieutenant General Joseph Leroy
Cavalry Lieutenant General Jules De Boeck
Lieutenant General Fernand Vanderhaeghen
Lieutenant General Robert Oor
Lieutenant General Libert Elie Thomas
Lieutenant General Léon Bievez
Cavalry Major General Baron Beaudoin de Maere d'Aertrycke
Major General Lucien Van Hoof
Major General Jean Buysse
Major General Paul Jacques
Commodore Georges Timmermans
Aviator Major General Norbert Leboutte
Police Lieutenant General Louis Joseph Leroy
Police Lieutenant General Oscar-Eugène Dethise
Chaplain General Louis Kerremans
Lieutenant General Harry Jungbluth
Cavalry Lieutenant General Baron Albert du Roy de Blicquy
Lieutenant General Sir Antonin de Selliers de Moranville
Lieutenant General Baron Louis de Ryckel
Lieutenant General Baron Émile Dossin de Saint-Georges
Lieutenant General Baron Honoré Drubbel
Lieutenant General Count Gérard-Mathieu Leman
Lieutenant General Victor Bertrand
Lieutenant General Baron Jules Jacques de Dixmude
Lieutenant General Georges Guiette
Lieutenant General Albert Lantonnois van Rode
Lieutenant General Baron Armand de Ceuninck
Lieutenant General Aloïs Biebuyck
Cavalry Lieutenant General Baron Léon de Witte de Haelen
Cavalry Lieutenant General Vicount Victor Buffin de Chosal
Cavalry Lieutenant General Jules De Blauwe
Major General Doctor Antoine Depage
Major General Baron Edouard Empain

See also

 List of Orders, Decorations and Medals of the Kingdom of Belgium

References

Other sources
 Quinot H., 1950, Recueil illustré des décorations belges et congolaises, 4e Edition. (Hasselt)
 Cornet R., 1982, Recueil des dispositions légales et réglementaires régissant les ordres nationaux belges. 2e Ed. N.pl., (Brussels)
 Borné A.C., 1985, Distinctions honorifiques de la Belgique, 1830–1985 (Brussels)

External links
Bill's Belgian Medals & Books
Bibliothèque royale de Belgique (In French)
Les Ordres Nationaux Belges (In French)
ARS MORIENDI Notables from Belgian history (In French and Dutch)

Armed Resistance 1940-1945, Medal of the
Military awards and decorations of Belgium
Awards established in 1919
Campaign medals
Belgium in World War I
Military awards and decorations of World War I